The 2015–16 Northern Kentucky Norse men's basketball team represented Northern Kentucky University (NKU) during the 2015–16 NCAA Division I men's basketball season. The Norse, led by first head coach John Brannen, played their home games at BB&T Arena and were first year members of the Horizon League. Due to their transition to Division I, the Norse were ineligible to participate in NCAA-operated postseason play, specifically the NCAA tournament and NIT, and will remain ineligible for those tournaments until the 2016–17 season. They finished the season 9–21, 5–13 in Horizon League play to finish in eighth place. They lost in the first round of the Horizon League tournament to Milwaukee.

Roster

Schedule and results
Source:

|-
!colspan=9 style="background:#000000; color:#FFD700;"| Exhibition

|-
!colspan=9 style="background:#000000; color:#FFD700;"| Regular season

|-
!colspan=9 style="background:#000000; color:#FFD700;"| Horizon League regular season

|-
!colspan=9 style="background:#000000; color:#FFD700;"|Horizon League tournament

References

Northern Kentucky Norse men's basketball seasons
Northern Kentucky